Spiroceratium is a monotypic genus of flowering plants belonging to the family Apiaceae. The only species is Spiroceratium bicknellii.

The species is found in the Balearic Islands.

References

Apiaceae
Monotypic Apiaceae genera
Flora of the Balearic Islands